Neoregelia nivea is a plant species in the genus Neoregelia native to Brazil.

Cultivars 
 Neoregelia 'Key West'

References 

BSI Cultivar Registry Retrieved 11 October 2009

nivea
Flora of Brazil